Jorge Manuel Theotocópuli de las Cuevas (1578, Toledo - 29 March 1631, Toledo) was a Greek-Spanish painter and architect. He was the only son of the iconic painter, Doménikos Theotokópoulos, called "El Greco".

Biography
He learned his trade working in the studios of his father. Around 1603, he participated in creating custom altarpieces in Illescas; his first documented work. Later, in 1607, he began to work more independently, producing an altarpiece in Titulcia which, although generally done in his father's style, showed a glimmer of his own personality.

From 1612 to 1618, he was involved in completing construction on the Casa Consistorial (City Hall) of Toledo.

He was also involved in a few somewhat less serious projects, such as designing a comedy theater called the "Mesón de la Fruta", which was demolished in the 1870s.

He eventually came to financial ruin from a dispute with the Hospital de Tavera, where his father had left a major commission uncompleted. The affair ended with the seizure of his property.

Gallery

References

External links
 
 
Mozarabic Chapel, Toledo Cathedral at ArteHistoria.
El Hijo del Greco en Toledo at Vivir Toledo

 

1578 births
1631 deaths
16th-century Spanish architects
17th-century Spanish architects
People from Toledo, Spain
Spanish people of Greek descent
16th-century Greek painters
17th-century Greek painters